The Central Avian Research Institute of India (CARI)  is a research institute located at Izzatnagar near Bareilly, Uttar Pradesh state, India. It studies poultry science, including avian genetics, breeding, nutrition and feed technology, and avian physiology and reproduction, for the betterment of the Indian poultry industry.

The institute was established in 1979 under the administrative control of Indian Council of Agricultural Research (ICAR), New Delhi, and offers also education, training, and consultancy services.

Directors of institute
Dr. B. Panda (2 Nov. 1979 to 31 March 1990)
Dr. J.N.Panda (1 April 1990 to 25 March 1992) (Acting); 26 March 1992 to 31 Aug. 1992
Dr. P.K.Pani (Acting) (1 Sept. 1992 to 31 Jan. 1994)
Dr. D.C.Johari (Acting) (1 Feb. 1994 to 24 Aug. 1994) (1 Dec. 1996 to 13 Oct. 1997)
Dr. S.C. Mohapatra (25 Aug. 1994 to 30 Nov. 1996)
Dr. Rajvir Singh (14 Oct. 1997 to 6 March 2003) (24 Oct. 2003 to 3 Oct. 2006) (10 Nov. 2006 to 3 Dec. 2006
Dr. T.S. Johri (Acting) (7 March 2003 to 23 Oct. 2003)
Dr. A. K. Shrivastav (Acting) (4 Oct. 2006 to 9 Nov. 2006) (4 Dec. 2006 to 18 July 2007) (1 Feb. 2010 to 7 Feb. 2010) (19 March 2011 to 12 April 2011)
Dr. B.P. Singh (19 July 2007 to 31 Jan. 2010)
Dr. R.P.Singh (Current)

References

Indian Council of Agricultural Research
Agricultural research institutes in Uttar Pradesh
Research institutes established in 1979
Poultry research institutes
Poultry industry in India
Education in Bareilly
Scientific organisations based in India
Veterinary research institutes
1979 establishments in Uttar Pradesh
Veterinary medicine in India